Gambier Island is an island located in Howe Sound near Vancouver, British Columbia.

A rugged and sparsely populated island, it is far quieter than its neighbour Bowen Island, which is popular with day-trippers and summer vacationers. Gambier Island is accessible only by B.C. Ferries passenger service, water taxi or other boats.  There is no central road network.

The island elects two trustees to the Islands Trust, an organization that unites small island communities in British Columbia to oversee development and land use. Other islands in Howe Sound include Keats Island and Anvil Island.  The island is part of West Howe Sound, Electoral Area F within the Sunshine Coast Regional District (SCRD) on the Sunshine Coast of British Columbia, Canada.

Population
There are around 150 long-term residents on Gambier, but the population swells to more than 800 in the summertime due to the island's recreational properties. The island's scenic setting and solitude make it popular with artists and writers.

Communities
The main wharf and settlement area is called New Brighton, on the west side of the island. Gambier Harbour, West Bay, lies to the east, with another wharf and boat dock.  At the north end of the island is Ekins Point.  Off-grid communities include Douglas Bay, Daisy Bay, Gambier Acres, Ekins Point, Brigade Bay (coordinates   ), Fircom Plateau (coordinates ), Sea Ranch (coordinates ).

Facilities
Gambier Island had a general store (closed about 2010) and few seasonal options for accommodations. Barging companies provide service from Gibsons and Horseshoe Bay for transport of large items. Fire service is run by volunteers. There are no garbage processing facilities on the island. There is a community centre.

Halkett Bay Provincial Park is located on the southeast side of Gambier.

History
Squamish people called the island Cha7élkwnech, in reference to its deep protected bays. It was a celebrated deer hunting area and was extensively used for resource gathering.

The island was named by Captain Richards in 1860 for James Gambier, Admiral of the Fleet who had a distinguished career in the British navy, was a Governor of Newfoundland and served as a negotiator of the Treaty of Ghent ending The War of 1812 between Britain and the United States. Logger Ken Reid cut a 14-foot diameter fir there in the 1930s.

References

External links
Camp Latona
Gambier Island Local Trust
Camp Fircom Society
Camp Artaban
Gambier Community Centre
Commotion by the Ocean Summer concert
Gambier Island Conservancy

 
South Coast of British Columbia
Sunshine Coast Regional District